Seemapuri is a neighborhood in Delhi, India and one of the subdivisions of Shahdara District.

References 

 

Neighbourhoods in Delhi
District subdivisions of Delhi